Abraham Waligo (28 July 1928 – 6 March 2000) was the 4th Prime Minister of Uganda from 25 August 1985 to 26 January 1986.

Biography 

Waligo studied electrical engineering in South Africa and the United Kingdom. After graduating in 1955, he was the first electrical engineer in Central and Eastern Africa. After a two-year vocational training program at various UK power utilities, he returned to his home country in 1957 and became chief engineer of the Electricity Authority (UEB). In 1969, Waligo founded an engineering office. In addition, he has been involved in the association of engineers and in the field of higher education for engineers. Later, he also held the position of managing director of Uganda Airlines.

During his subsequent political career, Waligo was Minister of Housing and Urban Development and Minister of Finance.

Waligo was prime minister from 25 August 1985 to 26 January 1986, succeeding former President Paulo Muwanga. Samson Kisekka followed in January 1986. During his tenure as prime minister, he continued to serve as Minister of Finance.

References

1925 births
2000 deaths
Prime Ministers of Uganda
Finance Ministers of Uganda